Ruxandra (Andra) Nedelcu (born 30 November 1984) is a Romanian freestyle skier, specializing in ski cross.

Nedelcu competed at the 2010 Winter Olympics for Romania. She placed 33rd in the qualifying round in ski cross, and did not advance to the knockout rounds due to a knee injury.

Nedelcu made her World Cup debut in January 2009. As of April 2013, her best finish at a World Cup event is 26th, coming at St. Johann in 2009/10.

Nedelcu retired from freestyle skiing in 2011 and currently resides in West Vancouver, Canada with her husband and two children.

References

1984 births
Living people
Olympic freestyle skiers of Romania
Freestyle skiers at the 2010 Winter Olympics
Sportspeople from Brașov
Romanian female freestyle skiers